Janelle Marie Pierzina (born January 10, 1980) is an American reality show personality known for her appearances on the sixth, seventh, fourteenth, and twenty-second seasons of the reality show Big Brother and the thirty-first season of The Amazing Race. In 2022, Pierzina was a co-winner of the USA Network competition series Snake in the Grass.

Biography 
Before appearing on Big Brother, Pierzina was an actress, model, and cocktail waitress.

In 2000, Pierzina was convicted of a misdemeanor DWI infraction in Minnesota, for which she was fined and sent to an alcohol-awareness program. In 2001 she was charged with and pleaded guilty to misdemeanor theft from Macy's, for which she was fined.

Pierzina is now a real estate agent in Minnesota for Edina Realty.

Personal life 
In August 2013, Pierzina  gave birth to her second child, a boy. In April 2014, Pierzina confirmed that she was expecting her third child. In September 2014, she gave birth to a girl.

Big Brother & The Amazing Race
In 2005, Pierzina was one of fourteen contestants on Big Brother 6. Her secret partner was former roommate, Ashlea Evans. Pierzina came in third, being evicted on September 16, 2005, Day 76.

In the summer of 2006, Pierzina was chosen by the viewers to participate in Big Brother 7: All-Stars and entered the house on July 3, 2006. Pierzina was eventually evicted on Day 67, again taking third place and becoming a member of the seven-contestant jury. On September 12, 2006, the final day of Big Brother 7:All-Stars, Pierzina was named the winner of the final America's Choice vote, a $25,000 prize to a jury member.  Popular with fans, Pierzina won every America's Choice award during Big Brother 6.

In September, 2007, Pierzina returned to host the Power Of Veto competition in the Big Brother 8 house. On August 9, 2008, in the Big Brother 10 house, Pierzina again returned to participate in the week's food competition. Along with other BB alumni, including Mike "Boogie" Malin and Danielle Reyes, Janelle returned to Big Brother in September 2009 for a roundtable discussion of Big Brother 11.

In 2012, Pierzina returned once again to the Big Brother house for the show's 14th season. She was the fourth contestant evicted.

After her appearance on Big Brother All Stars, Pierzina won the VH1 Big Reality Star of '06 award.
She was named the biggest "winner" of Big Brother by BuddyTV based on number of combined Head of Household and Power of Veto competition victories during her first two seasons with 12.5.

She competed on the 31st season of The Amazing Race with her teammate Britney Haynes, another former contestant from Big Brother. They were the fourth team eliminated from the race.

In August 2020, it was announced that Pierzina would once again be a houseguest for Big Brothers 22nd season, which is also the series' second All-Stars season. She was the third contestant to be evicted.

Filmography

As Herself

As Actress

Awards and nominations

References

External links 
 Janelle's Myspace
 Profile of Janelle Pierzina by CBS for Big Brother 6 
 Profile of Janelle Pierzina by CBS for Big Brother 7 
 Profile of Janelle Pierzina by CBS for Big Brother 14
 Profile of Janelle Pierzina by CBS for Big Brother 22
 Profile of Janelle Pierzina and Britney Haynes for The Amazing Race 31

American female models
Big Brother (American TV series) contestants
The Amazing Race (American TV series) contestants
Living people
People from Lakeville, Minnesota
American people convicted of theft
1980 births